Saint-Palais is the name or part of the name of several communes in France: